Microptilotis is a genus of birds in the honeyeater family Meliphagidae. 

The genus was introduced in 1912 by the Australian ornithologist Gregory Mathews with the graceful honeyeater (Microptilotis gracilis) as the type species. The genus name Microptilotis combines the Ancient Greek mikros meaning "small" and the genus name Ptilotis. 

The genus contains 10 species:
 Mottle-breasted honeyeater (Microptilotis mimikae)
 Forest honeyeater (Microptilotis montana)
 Mountain honeyeater (Microptilotis orientalis)
 Scrub honeyeater (Microptilotis albonotata)
 Mimic honeyeater (Microptilotis analoga)
 Tagula honeyeater (Microptilotis vicina)
 Graceful honeyeater (Microptilotis gracilis)
 Cryptic honeyeater (Microptilotis  imitatrix)
 Elegant honeyeater (Microptilotis cinereifrons)
 Yellow-gaped honeyeater (Microptilotis flavirictus)

The species now placed in Microptilotis were formerly placed in the genus Meliphaga. When molecular phylogenetic studies found that Meliphaga contained two distinct clades, the genus was split and many of the species transferred to the resurrected genus Microptilotis.

References

 
Bird genera
Taxa named by Gregory Mathews